Cydnoseius is a genus of mites in the Phytoseiidae family.

Species
 Cydnoseius muntius (Schicha & Corpuz-Raros, 1992)
 Cydnoseius negevi (Swirski & Amitai, 1961)

References

Phytoseiidae